Charlie Edward Jones (born December 1, 1972) is a former professional American football player who was drafted by the San Diego Chargers in the 4th round of the 1996 NFL Draft. A 5'8" wide receiver from Fresno State University, Jones played in 4 NFL seasons for the Chargers from 1996 to 1999.  He attended Lemoore High School.

References 

1972 births
Living people
People from Hanford, California
Fresno State Bulldogs football players
San Diego Chargers players
American football wide receivers
Players of American football from California